Gonicoelus is a genus of beetles in the family Biphyllidae, containing the following species:

 Gonicoelus affinis Grouvelle, 1902
 Gonicoelus angustus Sharp, 1900
 Gonicoelus arduus Sharp, 1900
 Gonicoelus armatus Grouvelle
 Gonicoelus bimargo Sharp, 1900
 Gonicoelus boliviensis Grouvelle
 Gonicoelus brevicollis Sharp, 1900
 Gonicoelus cavifrons Grouvelle
 Gonicoelus celatus Sharp, 1900
 Gonicoelus championi Sharp, 1900
 Gonicoelus chontalensis Sharp, 1900
 Gonicoelus concolor Sharp, 1900
 Gonicoelus convexicollis Grouvelle
 Gonicoelus crispatus Sharp, 1900
 Gonicoelus cultratus Sharp, 1900
 Gonicoelus deplanatus Sharp, 1900
 Gonicoelus difficilis Grouvelle
 Gonicoelus fryi Grouvelle
 Gonicoelus germanus Sharp, 1900
 Gonicoelus guatemalenus Sharp, 1900
 Gonicoelus hirtus Sharp, 1900
 Gonicoelus humilis Sharp, 1900
 Gonicoelus hystrix Sharp, 1900
 Gonicoelus interstitialis Grouvelle
 Gonicoelus laticollis Sharp, 1900
 Gonicoelus latus Sharp, 1900
 Gonicoelus longicornis Sharp, 1900
 Gonicoelus mediocris Sharp, 1900
 Gonicoelus mexicanus Sharp, 1900
 Gonicoelus minax Grouvelle
 Gonicoelus mollis Sharp, 1900
 Gonicoelus monticola Sharp, 1900
 Gonicoelus muticus Sharp, 1900
 Gonicoelus oopsis Sharp, 1900
 Gonicoelus parnoides Sharp, 1900
 Gonicoelus planus Sharp, 1900
 Gonicoelus pulvinatus Grouvelle
 Gonicoelus relictus Sharp, 1900
 Gonicoelus rudis Sharp, 1900
 Gonicoelus rufiventris Grouvelle
 Gonicoelus securiger Sharp, 1900
 Gonicoelus segnis Sharp, 1900
 Gonicoelus sellatus Sharp, 1900
 Gonicoelus serricollis Grouvelle
 Gonicoelus sharpi Grouvelle
 Gonicoelus spheniscus Sharp, 1900
 Gonicoelus subtilis Sharp, 1900
 Gonicoelus throscoides Sharp, 1900
 Gonicoelus tricornis Sharp, 1900
 Gonicoelus unicornis Sharp, 1900
 Gonicoelus vestitus Sharp, 1900
 Gonicoelus wagmero Grouvelle

References

Biphyllidae
Cleroidea genera